The cinnamon ground dove (Gallicolumba rufigula) also known as golden-heart dove, red-throated ground dove or golden-heart pigeon is a species of ground-dwelling dove in the genus Gallicolumba.

It is native to New Guinea.

Description
The Cinnamon ground dove is around 22–24 cm long and can weigh anywhere from 121-137g. It has a red 'blushing' mark on its head with a light brown, grey colour covering its over-body it has a yellow marking on its belly which is surrounded by white. Some have blue markings on their heads and body.

Voice
A faint call sounding like a trill, the bird also has a soft purring sound that lasts for a few seconds.

Diet
The cinnamon ground dove's diet consists mainly of insects but also feeds on fallen fruits and seeds. It scavenges through the leaf litter that lies on the ground to find most of its food.

Subspecies

 Gallicolumba rufigula alaris
 Gallicolumba rufigula helviventris
 Gallicolumba rufigula orientalis
 Gallicolumba rufigula rufigula
 Gallicolumba rufigula septentrionalis

Further reading
 Bruce M. Beehler, Thane K. Pratt: Birds of New Guinea; Distribution, Taxonomy, and Systematics. Princeton University Press, Princeton 2016, ISBN 978-0-691-16424-3.
 David Gibbs, Eustace Barnes, John Cox: Pigeons and Doves. A Guide to the Pigeons and Doves of the World. Pica Press, Sussex 2001, ISBN 90-74345-26-3.
 Alois Münst und Josef Wolters: Tauben – Die Arten der Wildtauben, 2. erweiterte und überarbeitete Auflage, Verlag Karin Wolters, Bottrop 1999, ISBN 3-9801504-9-6.
 Gerhard Rösler: Die Wildtauben der Erde – Freileben, Haltung und Zucht. Verlag M. & H. Schaper, Alfeld-Hannover 1996, ISBN 3-7944-0184-0.

References

Information on Gallicolumba rufigula

External links

cinnamon ground dove
Birds of New Guinea
cinnamon ground dove